Linda Shannon (born 1969) is a former South African professional squash player who played for South Africa women's national squash team. Her highest career achievement was reaching quarterfinals of the Growthpoint SA Open during the 2018-19 PSA World Tour.

References

External links 

 

1969 births
Living people
South African female squash players